21st Rifle Division can refer to:

 21st Guards Motor Rifle Division (Russia)
 21st Guards Rifle Division
 21st Rifle Division (Soviet Union)